30 mm caliber is a specific size of popular autocannon ammunition. Such ammunition includes NATO standard 30×113mmB and 30×173mm (STANAG 4624), Soviet 30×155mmB, 30×165mm, and 30×210mmB, Yugoslav 30×192mm, Anglo-Swiss 30×170mm, and Czechoslovak 30×210mm rounds which are widely used around the world.

Usage

Thirty-millimeter ammunition is typically not used against personnel, but rather as an anti-materiel or armor-piercing round. Rounds of this size can be effective against lightly armored vehicles as well as fortified bunkers. It is also a popular caliber for shipboard close-in weapons systems, such as the Russian AK-630 and Dutch Goalkeeper CIWS.

The Armed Forces of the Russian Federation use their 30 mm weapons in a variety of vehicles, including the Su-25 attack aircraft, Mi-24 helicopter, Mi-28 attack helicopter, Ka-50 attack helicopter, and the BMP-2, BMP-3, and BTR-90 infantry fighting vehicles. The most modern anti-aircraft gun systems in use by Russia are 30 mm. The U.S. military uses 30 mm weapons in their A-10 Thunderbolt II ground-attack aircraft , AC-130 gunship (AC-130W Stinger II and AC-130J Ghostrider variants), and AH-64 Apache attack helicopter. It was going to be used in the Expeditionary Fighting Vehicle until the project was canceled.

Types of 30 mm ammunition
Thirty-millimeter ammunition generally comes in three varieties: armor-piercing (AP), high-explosive (HE), and target practice (TP) rounds. Both AP and HE cartridges commonly possess incendiary or tracer characteristics.

Examples of weapons using 30 mm ammunition

Historical weapons

Current weapons

See also
20 mm caliber
23 mm caliber
23×115mm
23×152mmB
25×137mm
35 mm caliber
37 mm caliber
40 mm grenade
List of cartridges (weaponry), pistol and rifle

References

External links
FAS: 30 mm Ammunition
ATK Products: M230
ATK Products: M230LF

Large-caliber cartridges